The following is a list of flags used in Ghana. for more information about the national flag, see The Flag of Ghana.

National Flag

Government Flags

Ethnic Group Flags

Political Party Flags

Military Flags

Proposed flags

Historical Flags

See also 

 Flag of Ghana
 Coat of arms of Ghana

References 

Lists and galleries of flags
Flags